José Víctor Alonzo (born 1 May 1959) is a Guatemalan racewalker. He competed in the men's 20 kilometres walk at the 1984 Summer Olympics.

References

External links

1959 births
Living people
Athletes (track and field) at the 1983 Pan American Games
Athletes (track and field) at the 1984 Summer Olympics
Athletes (track and field) at the 1987 Pan American Games
Guatemalan male racewalkers
Olympic athletes of Guatemala
Pan American Games competitors for Guatemala
Place of birth missing (living people)
20th-century Guatemalan people
21st-century Guatemalan people